Exserohilum oryzicola is a species of fungus in the family Pleosporaceae. Found in Colombia, where it grows on the leaves of Oryza sativa, it was described as new to science in 1984. It is distinguished from other Exserohilum species by its longer and more tapered conidia.

References

External links

Pleosporaceae
Fungi of Colombia
Fungi described in 1984